Jane is a village in McDonald County, Missouri, United States. It is located on Route 90 at its intersection with U.S. Route 71. The original settlement is approximately one mile east on an older alignment of US 71. It had been an unincorporated community for many years, and previously had the ZIP code of 64846, though rural delivery is currently managed from the post office in Anderson. Jane now shares the ZIP code of 64856 with Pineville, the county seat, and the post office which had previously been charged with rural mail delivery prior to its scaling back of operations.

Jane re-incorporated in 2005 after a petition-drive of local residents, in order to block possible annexation by Pineville, five miles to the northwest. Pineville had greatly expanded the city limit with the opening of the widened US 71 (later named Interstate 49) highway, to its west. In 2006, the village of Jane again expanded southward from its original boundaries to include a large section of US 71 at the behest of the McDonald County planning commission. It now extends south to within a half-mile of the Arkansas state line, abutting with the unincorporated Caverna, and running primarily along the US 71 corridor.

Municipal services include a volunteer fire department, rural water and sewer service that is tied via a lift-pump system with the sewage treatment plant in Bella Vista, Arkansas. Funding for the sewer system was provided by a municipal bond voted on by the residents in 2008, with the payback coming directly from those served. Electric power for the area is supplied by New-Mac Electric Company, a cooperative based in Neosho.

White Rock Elementary School, part of McDonald County R-I School District, is located near the village center.

Law enforcement and 911 services are provided by the McDonald County Sheriff's Office, located in Pineville.

Overview
Jane is part of the Fayetteville–Springdale–Rogers, AR-MO Metropolitan Statistical Area.

Jane is notable in that it is what some consider the epicenter of economic development in McDonald County as it is currently the only municipality in the county hosting a Walmart store.  Walmart's corporate headquarters are in nearby Bentonville, Arkansas. Of interest is a satellite of the McDonald County Sheriff's Office, located within the Walmart store building. Walmart also operates a large Data Center nicknamed Area 71, near Jane.

Demographics

2015 American Community Survey
As of the 2015 American Community Survey, the racial makeup of the city was:
95.7% White
1.3% American Indian and Alaska Native
0.4% Some other race
2.6% Two or more races
35.4% Hispanic or Latino (of any race)

References

Villages in McDonald County, Missouri
Northwest Arkansas
Populated places established in 2005
Villages in Missouri